Pudsey Greenside railway station is a closed railway station in Pudsey in the former West Riding of Yorkshire England, located about  west of Leeds station. It served the central part and western parts of Pudsey.

It was opened to passengers on 1 April 1878 as the terminus of a single-track branch line from Bramley, built by the Great Northern Railway. Freight traffic had already started in 1877. In 1893 this line was double-tracked and extended through Greenside Tunnel towards Laisterdyke and Dudley Hill, forming the Pudsey loop line railway. Upon the reorganisation of the railways in 1923, the line passed to the London and North Eastern Railway, and in 1948 to the Eastern Region of British Railways.

The station was located east of Carlisle Road, with the station building on its northern side. A substantial goods shed was built on the south side of the station.

The station and the line in its entirety were closed to all traffic on 15 June 1964. The site of the former station is now occupied by warehouses. The site where the goods sheds and sidings once stood is now housing.

References 

Disused railway stations in Leeds
Pudsey
Former Great Northern Railway stations
Railway stations in Great Britain opened in 1878
Railway stations in Great Britain closed in 1964
Beeching closures in England